A fox is small to medium-sized, omnivorous mammal.

Fox may also refer to:

Businesses

Entertainment and media companies 
 Fox Networks Group, a subsidiary of The Walt Disney Company
 Fox (international), a brand of television channels
 Fox Film, later part of 20th Century-Fox
 Fox Corporation, a media company controlled by Rupert Murdoch
 Fox Broadcasting Company

Other businesses
 Fox (automobile company) 1921–1923
 Fox (clothing), an Israel-based clothing company
 Fox Automotive Switzerland AG, who modified the Mia electric minivan as the Fox E-Mobility MIA 2.0
 Fox Brothers, an English clothmaker
 Fox Factory, an American company known for Fox Racing Shox racing suspension components
 Fox Racing, an apparel maker
 Fox Software, publisher of FoxPro

Arts, entertainment and media

Fictional characters 
 Fox (comics), the name of two fictional superheroes 
 Fox (Gargoyles), from the animated TV series
 Fox (Neighbours), in the Australian soap opera 
 Tails (Sonic the Hedgehog), also known as Tails The Fox, a character from the Sonic The Hedgehog series 
 Fox Crane, in the soap opera Passions 
 Fox McCloud, from video game series Star Fox
 Fox Mulder, in the TV show The X-Files

Film and television
 Fox (TV series), a 1980 British TV drama
 Fox (film), a 2009 Hindi thriller

Music 
 Fox (band), a British rock band of the 1970s
 Fox (album), 1975
 Fox, an Australian rock band of the 1970s that recorded the album What the Hell Is Going On?
 "Fox" (song), by Millencolin, 2000
 The Fox (Elton John album), 1981

Radio stations 
 Fox Radio (disambiguation), several uses
 Fox FM (Melbourne radio station), in Australia
 Fox FM Ghana
 Heart Oxfordshire, formerly Fox FM, in England
 Port FM, formerly Fox FM, in New Zealand
 WBAF, in Barnesville, Georgia, United States
 WBML, in Warner Robins, Georgia, United States
 WFDR (AM), in Manchester, Georgia, United States
 WQJJ-LP, in Jasper, Alabama, United States

Other uses and arts, entertainment and media

 Fox (Marc), a 1911 painting by Franz Marc
 Fox games, a category of asymmetric board games for two players
 The Fox (magazine), an American arts magazine (1975–76)
 Fox, a pornographic magazine published by Magna Publishing Group
 Fox (book), a children's book by Margaret Wild

People
 Fox (surname), including a list of people with the name
 Fox (gamer) (Ricardo Pacheco (born 1986), Portuguese professional game player
 Fox Butterfield (born 1939), American journalist
 Fox Conner (1874–1951), American major-general and mentor of Dwight D. Eisenhower
 Fox Fisher (born 1980), Indian-British artist, film maker, author and trans campaigner
 Fox Harris (1936–1988), American actor
 Fox Henderson (1853–1918), American businessman and banking entrepreneur
 Fox Maule-Ramsay, 11th Earl of Dalhousie (1801–1874), British politician
 W. Fox McKeithen (1946–2005), American politician
 "Fox Ryder", stage name of Sean Paul Lockhart (born 1986), American film actor and director
 Fox Stanton (1874–1946), American football player and coach
 Fox Stevenson (born 1993), English singer-songwriter

Places

Australia 
 Fox, South Australia

United States 

 Fox, Alaska
 Fox, Arkansas
 Fox, Illinois
 Fox, Indiana
 Fox, Kentucky
 Fox, Minnesota
 Fox, Montana
 Fox, Ohio
 Fox, Oklahoma
 Fox, Oregon
 Fox, Virginia

Transportation and military

Land
 Audi 80, or Audi Fox, a compact executive car 
 Volkswagen Fox, a subcompact car 
 Volkswagen Gol, or VW Fox, a subcompact car
 Fox, a West Cornwall Railway steam locomotive
 NSU Fox, a light motorcycle 
 Fox armoured reconnaissance vehicle, a British armoured car
 Fox Armoured Car, a Canadian wheeled armoured fighting vehicle
 M93 Fox, an armored personnel carrier

Sea
 Fox (boat), built in 1896 to be rowed across the Atlantic 
 Fox (ship), an 1854 steam yacht
 Fox, the name of two Hudson's Bay Company vessels
 HMS Fox, several British ships and shore installations

Air
 Fox (code word), a brevity code for air-to-air munitions release
 Fairey Fox, a British light bomber and fighter biplane

Other uses 
 Fox (crater), on the moon
 Fox (rabbit), a breed of rabbit
 Fox (tribe), a Native American people
 FOX proteins, a family of transcription factors
 Fox toolkit, software for building graphical user interfaces
 IDEA NXT, formerly FOX, a block cipher
 Formosan languages, ISO 639-5 language code fox

See also 
 
 
 Fox's (disambiguation)
 Foxe (disambiguation)
 Foxes (disambiguation)
 Foxing, discoloration on old paper
 Foxx, a surname
 Fox Creek (disambiguation)
 Fox Crossing (disambiguation)
 Fox Glacier, a glacier and town in New Zealand
 Fox Islands (disambiguation)
 Fox Lake (disambiguation)
 Fox Movies (disambiguation)
 Fox River (disambiguation)
 Fox Theatre (disambiguation)
 Fox Valley (disambiguation)
 The Fox (disambiguation)
 Flying Fox (disambiguation)
 20th Century Fox (disambiguation)

English unisex given names